This is a complete list of episodes for the Japanese anime television series Azumanga Daioh produced by the animation studio J.C.Staff, and based on the manga series of the same name written and illustrated by Kiyohiko Azuma. The series originally aired on TV Tokyo, TV Aichi, TV Osaka, and AT-X in five-minute segments each weekday from 8 April 2002 until 30 September 2002. Each week's segments were repeated that weekend in a 25-minute compilation episode with an opening and credits, for a total of 130 five-minute segments and 26 episode compilations. The compilation episodes were released to VHS and DVD by Starchild Records; the five-minute segments can be distinguished by their individual titles.

In the United States, the anime television series was released by ADV Films in both a six-volume DVD set on 9 September 2005, and later reissued as a five-volume "thinpak" DVD set. The sixth DVD volume of the first release included The Very Short Azumanga Daioh Movie. The first three episodes are available for iOS, although episode two requires Wi-Fi.
 


Episode list

Music 

Two original soundtracks were released that were composed by Masaki Kurihara. The two soundtracks to the anime were released in the United States by Geneon. The opening to each episode uses a song called . Soramimi Cake was performed by Oranges & Lemons, Aki Hata provided the lyrics, and Masumi Itō the music. The ending of each episode uses a song called "Raspberry Heaven". Oranges & Lemons again performed this song while Aki provided the lyrics, Raspberry Heaven's music was done by Yōko Ueno.

References

Azumanga Daioh
Azumanga Daioh